Janie Finlay is an Australian politician. She was first elected to the Launceston City Council in 2000 and from 2002 to 2005 served as Mayor. When Finlay was elected to that position in February 2002, at age 27, she was the youngest female mayor to serve in Australia.

She lost her mayoral position in the October 2005 elections to Ivan Dean by a slim majority after the distribution of preferences. She had been the favourite in her race for a second term, and on 26 October 2005. The Examiner local newspaper ran a front-page story claiming she was winning by 2000 votes. But by the next day it was revealed Ivan Dean had secured the lead by some 400 votes after preferences. Finlay was, however, re-elected as an alderman, securing more than two quotas. She resigned from council in 2007.

Finlay later regained her position in the 2014 local government elections, safely securing a position as Alderman on the Launceston City Council.

In May 2021 Finlay was elected to the Tasmanian House of Assembly as a Labor representative for Bass.

References

External links

 

Mayors of Launceston, Tasmania
Women mayors of places in Tasmania
Living people
Year of birth missing (living people)
Australian Labor Party members of the Parliament of Tasmania
Members of the Tasmanian House of Assembly
Women members of the Tasmanian House of Assembly
21st-century Australian politicians
21st-century Australian women politicians
Tasmanian local councillors